WWCL (1440 AM) is a Spanish Christian music and teaching station. Licensed to Lehigh Acres, Florida, United States, the station serves the Fort Myers area.

External links
Radio Visión Cristiana

WCL